Po Keng Teng is a mountain inside Clear Water Bay Country Park, Sai Kung, New Territories, Hong Kong, with a height of .

Geography 
Po Keng Teng is in the Clear Water Bay Peninsula region. To the west is a golf club.

The are no public roads that lead to the mountain because a private golf club separates it from the nearest public road.  The trails to the summit are rather rocky, and not maintained by the government, so proper hiking footwear is advisable. The cliff on its east side is very steep.

Geology 

Po Keng Teng is formed by volcanic rocks, like many of the tallest mountains in Hong Kong, such as Tai Mo Shan. Some shorter mountains in Hong Kong are formed by older granitic rocks.

References

See also 

 List of mountains, peaks and hills in Hong Kong

 Clear Water Bay Country Park